Peter Levin is an American director. 

Peter Levin may also refer to:

 Peter Levin, co-founder of Nerdist Industries
 Pete Levin (born 1942), American jazz keyboardist, composer, and record producer
 Peter Levin, keyboard musician and past member of The Blind Boys of Alabama

See also
 Peter Leven
 Peter Levine (disambiguation)
 Peter Levinson